The following is a list of United States ambassadors to Sudan.  The first chief of mission sent by the United States was Arthur E. Beach, who presented his credentials in March 1956.  From 1967 to 1972 the embassy was closed, and a U.S. Interest Section was opened in the Netherlands Embassy.  In 1973 Ambassador Cleo A. Noel, Jr. was taken hostage and killed by the Black September Organization during the attack on the Saudi embassy in Khartoum. The embassy was again closed in 1996, but reopened in 2002. From 2002 to 2022, the United States posted a sequence of chargés d'affaires ad interim to the country. Ambassador-level representation resumed in 2022 with the appointment of Ambassador John Godfrey.

Ambassadors

Notes

See also
Sudan – United States relations
Foreign relations of Sudan
Ambassadors of the United States

References
United States Department of State: Background notes on Sudan

External links
 United States Department of State: Chiefs of Mission for Sudan
 United States Department of State: Sudan
 United States Embassy in Khartoum

Sudan
 
United States